Aasmanon Pay Likha (meaning  Written on skies) is a TV show that aired on Geo Entertainment television. It stars Sajal Ali and Sheheryar Munawar in lead roles.

Plot 
Qudsia (Sajal Ali) is a middle-class girl who dreams of a simple married life. Unfortunately, her in-laws demand a hefty sum of dowry. Qudsia's family were not able to pay the dowry. Her father eventually has a heart attack after getting insulted. Aaliyan who comes actually to his employee's marriage ends up marrying Qudsia.

Qudsia marries Aaliyan who doesn't believe in the nikkah as he only sees it as a deal to protect her and is still adamant on marrying his longtime fiancée Natasha. Aaliyan's family burst on him for marrying such a girl without even informing them. Aaliyan is close to his Dadi. Aaliyan (Sheheryar Munawar Siddiqui) tells his Dadi about the drama. His Dadi says that she'll try to resolve the matter. She goes to Qudsia's house to talk about it but as her father's health was becoming weaker she couldn't. He says that as long Qudsia is happy and married, his heart beats would actually beat. Dadi takes Qudsia back home. There Natasha is again angry on Aaliyan and leaves his room crashing with Qudsia. She gets even more upset. Aaliyan asks Dadi why she brought Qudsia with her again. Dadi explains him the entire matter. He asks that he'll give her a divorce but her Dadi warns him not to do so. Dadi tells him how good Qudsia is and how this will affect her and her family though it is not even her mistake. Later after some day Qudsia's father decides to work again. He goes to office where Aaliyan's father insult him and his daughter which results in him getting heart attack after which he eventually dies. Qudsia gets depressed and breaks down in front of Aaliyan. Aaliyan supports her and consoles her. Later he returns to his house where everyone is really angry with him. He decides to go back at Qudsia's place. He goes there and stays there. Later he tells Qudsia that he has to leave. Qudsia asks him to stay as it was raining.  But Aaliyan does not listen. But his car gets damaged. So he stays there. Next day Natasha comes there angrily and takes Aaliyan with her. Natasha and Aaliyan soon get married. They live in America whereas Qudsia gets a job at Aaliyan's real mom's place. She takes care of her unaware of the fact that she is Aaliyan's real mother.

Meanwhile, relations between Aaliyan and Natasha are not good. Natasha keeps thinking that Aaliyan is cheating on her. Soon they come to Pakistan. Natasha is mad on Aaliyan everyday on one or the other matter. Shamsa (Saba Hameed) (Aaliyan's real mother) starts liking Qudsia for Shehnawas (Shamsa's brother) whose wife is dead. Shamsa then visits Aaliyan's Dadi. She gives  her address and asks her to give it to Aaliyan. Dadi gives it to Aaliyan and asks him to meet her. He then goes to her but is really angry at her as she left him while he was young. Shamsa gets emotional and just wishes to talk to him and hug him but he refuses and then leaves. Shamsa then tells Qudsia that today his son came and met her. Qudsia gets happy for her. Shamsa then tells her something where she mentions Aaliyan and a glass falls from Qudsia's hand as she is in deep shock. After few days Aaliyan again goes and visits her mom as he is really angry and wants to know why she left him. As he gets off his car he meets Shehnawas along with his daughter. His daughter greets her and says "Nice to meet you uncle" to which he replies "Nice to meet you" and then sees Qudsia and says "Again". They then get into the house where Aaliyan continues to shout at his mother and she cries. He then leaves. Later Shamsa's health conditions go worse as she has cancer at last stage. Aaliyan comes there. She says that she just wants to hug him but he refuses and leaves. Soon Shamsa passes away. Qudsia keeps calling Aaliyan bt he couldn't answer as he was sleeping. Later when he goes to hospital he breaks down in tears and hugs his mom. He asks his dad about his mom and then gets to know that his mom wasn't a bad woman. He shouts in tear and leaves. His dad comes to his dadi and shouts at her on various matters which causes her death. When Aaliyan returns to her he keeps talking to her and realizes that she has died. He again breaks down on tears. Later Shahnewas informs Qudsia about her death which results in Qudsia crying. She  tries calling Aaliyan. There Aaliyan calls on Shamsa's phone for which he was sure that Qudsia would pick and she did. He cries on the phone as does Qudsia. Qudsia then goes to Aaliyan's place. Consoles him. While she is about to go Aaliyan holds her hand and asks her not to go. He says "ki Mai  bhi ruka tha kyunki tumhe meri zaroorat thi" to which she replies "Aap ruke kyunki aap ki gaadi kharab hogayi thi". He then admits that his car wasn't damaged. Soon his dad arrives and insults Qudsia. She goes down and Natasha arrives there and ends up by slapping. She insults her. Shehnawas comes and takes her back. Later Aaliyan comes to Qudsia and tells Shehnawas about him and Qudsia. Aaliyan says Qudsia that he needs him. She says that their marriage was a contract. Aaliyan says that he was sure that she would never tell this marriage is  a contract. She says to give her a divorce. He says that "Pehle tum divorce nahi chahti thi aur ab mai ...mai tumhe divorce nahi dunga". She again says to give her a divorce. He holds her hand, holds her closer, and says that she is his wife. She says being a wife does not mean that whenever he wants he can hold her hands and whenever he wants he can leave. He apologizes to her. He then says that hell be coming tomorrow and asks her to be ready. When he reaches home Natasha shouts and says that she can't live with him anymore. She goes to America. Later Aaliyan's dad goes and insults Qudsia to which she answers sincerely. The film ends with Aaliyan and Qudsia shown happy together.

Cast 
 Sajal Ali as Qudsia
 Sheheryar Munawar Aaliyan
 Sanam Chaudhry as Natasha
 Saba Hameed as Shamsa
 Emmad Irfani as Shahnawaz
 Naima Khan as Abda
 Sukaina Khan as Sobia
 Azra Aftab as Aaliyan's grandmother
 Farah Nadir as Asma
 Mehmood Akhtar as Aaliyan's father
 Saba Faisal as Aaliyan's mother
 Tariq Jameel as Qudsia's father
 Sumera Hassan as Haleema, Shehzad's mother
 Yasir Ali Khan as Adil
 Nasreen John as Shehzad's aunt
 Birjees Farooqui as Aapa
 Rehana Kaleem	as Adil's mother
 Pari Hashmi as Qudisa's siser
 Urooj Abbas as Ashraf Hussain
 Manzoor Qureshi as Shahnawaz's father

Production and project details

Original sound track

Reception 
The drama serial soon became popular after its premiere. Most popular serial of that time received the highest TRPs of 10. The drama serial even beat the 2011's blockbuster Humsafar in terms of ratings and became the highest rated drama serial in the history of Pakistani satellite television. The serial's GRPs was 521 of only 20 episodes while that of Humsafar had a GRPs of 353 (which had total 23 episodes). However, some critics remarked that Aly was typecast as she earlier played the similar character, Gori in Gohar-e-Nayab.

Accolades

Awards

Nominations
 Lux Style Awards - Best TV Play
 Lux Style Awards - Best TV Director - Mohsin Mirza

See also 
 List of programs broadcast by Geo TV
 2014 in Pakistani television
 2013 in Pakistani television

References

External links 

 Asmanon Pay Likha On Pakistani Drama

Geo TV original programming
2013 Pakistani television series debuts
Pakistani drama television series
2014 Pakistani television series endings
Urdu-language television shows
A&B Entertainment